Haringtonhippus is an extinct genus of equine from the Pleistocene of North America The genus is monospecific, consisting of the species H. francisci, initially described in 1915 by Oliver Perry Hay as Equus francisci. Prior to the naming of the genus, it was sometimes referred to as the New World stilt-legged horse, in reference to its slender distal limb bones, in contrast with those of contemporary "stout legged" caballine true horses.

Haringtonhippus fossils have only been discovered in North America. Specimens have been found from southern Mexico to southern South Dakota and in Alberta, Canada, at sites such as Gypsum Cave and Natural Trap Cave, as well as eastern Beringia in Yukon A later study found that Equus cedralensis from the Late Pleistocene of Mexico also belonged to this species. The earliest species of the lineage appeared in North America during the Late Pliocene to Early Pleistocene, around 2 to 3 Ma. It became extinct at the end of the Late Pleistocene.

Taxonomy 
Haringtonhippus is named after Charles Richard Harington. It was originally described as a new Equus species, E. francisci, in 1915. Dalquest (1979) considered Equus tau , described from teeth in Mexico, a senior synonym of E. francisci, while Equus quinni and E. arrelanoi were synonymized with E. francisci by Winans (1989). The species Equus achates Hay and Cook, 1930 (synonymized with E. tau by Dalquest 1979) was synonymized with E. francisci by Hulbert (1995), who also declared E. tau and E. littoralis nomina dubia.

Phylogenetics
A 2017 paper placed Equus francisci outside Equus based on a phylogenetic analysis of DNA sequences, leading to erection of the new genus Haringtonhippus. The genus is phylogenetically closer to Equus than to Hippidion. It is estimated to have diverged from Equus around 4.1–5.7 million years ago, during the late Hemphillian or early Blancan.

A 2019 morphological study found H. francisci to be nested within Equus in a polytomy with E. conversidens and the plains zebra (E. quagga), supporting synonymization of Haringtonhippus with Equus. The genetic study had not included E. stenonis and E. simplicidens (which were recovered by morphology as outgroups of Equus, albeit closer to Equus than Hippidion, reassigning them to Allohippus and Plesippus, respectively) due to a lack of genetic data for these species, and so did not resolve their relationships to H. francisci. To further explore this, a second morphological analysis was performed in which H. francisci was constrained to lie outside of crown Equus. In this analysis, H. francisci was found to be a sister clade of either crown Equus or the clade comprising crown Equus + E. idahoensis, but with trees 6 steps longer than the most parsimonious unconstrained analysis.

In addition to its phylogenetic position, the divergence times estimated from DNA sequences may suggest that Haringtonhippus, and possibly even Hippidion, should possibly be synonymised with Equus based on the divergence time criterion (i.e. that groups should be considered distinct genera only if they diverged long before the Miocene–Pliocene boundary) (Groves, 2001, 2004; Groves and Grubb, 2011), but this criterion is mainly designed for use with extant species and may not be suitable for clades which diverged close to the Miocene–Pliocene boundary.

Notes

References

Equus (genus)
Pliocene horses
Prehistoric mammals of North America
Pleistocene horses
Pliocene first appearances
Pleistocene species extinctions
Fossil taxa described in 1915